Jules Schwadorf (born 19 October 1992) is a German professional footballer who plays as a midfielder for Fortuna Köln.

References

Living people
1992 births
Association football midfielders
German footballers
Bayer 04 Leverkusen II players
Fortuna Düsseldorf II players
TSG 1899 Hoffenheim II players
SG Wattenscheid 09 players
FC Viktoria Köln players
SV Wehen Wiesbaden players
SC Preußen Münster players
SC Fortuna Köln players
3. Liga players
Regionalliga players